Minna Lachs (born as Minna Schiffmann; 1907–1993) was an Austrian educator and memoirist. She was born in Terebovlia, then Trembowla in what was then referred to as the Kingdom of Galicia and Lodomeria. The events of World War I led them to leave for Vienna. Her father wished to distance himself from his Orthodox Judaism upbringing, but she initially felt a need to more strongly assert a Jewish identity. As part of that she joined a Zionist youth organization which ultimately led to an interest in Socialism and to meeting her husband. She went on to graduate from the University of Vienna with a thesis on Karl Emil Franzos. She fled Austria for Switzerland due to the Anschluss. Her memoir concerning the period was titled Warum schaust du zurueck. She returned to Vienna after the war. She was cremated at Feuerhalle Simmering, where also her ashes are buried. A park in Vienna is named for her.

References 

Austrian educators
Austrian women educators
Austrian Jews
Austrian socialists
Austrian Zionists
People from Ternopil Oblast
University of Vienna alumni
1907 births
1993 deaths
Burials at Feuerhalle Simmering
Women memoirists